Solidago ouachitensis is a North American species of flowering plants in the family Asteraceae known by the common name Ouachita Mountain goldenrod. It has a very limited range, found only in the Ouachita Mountains along the border between Arkansas and Oklahoma in the United States.

Solidago ouachitensis is a perennial herb growing up to about 1.1 meters (44 inches) in height. It produces one or more erect stems from a woody caudex. The serrated (toothed) leaves are 10 to 13 centimeters (4.0-5.2 inches) long around the middle of the plant and smaller higher on the stem. One plant will produce 25-50 bell-shaped flower heads. Each flower head usually contains one yellow ray floret and 4-5 disc florets. Flowering occurs in September and October.

Solidago ouachitensis is likely a relict of times when conditions were colder and wetter. It only occurs in the cooler, moister sites in the Ouachita Mountains, usually in wet forest habitat on north-facing slopes. Associated species include Magnolia tripetala, Fagus grandifolia, Acer rubrum, Quercus rubra, Aesculus glabra, Asarum canadense, Campanula americana, Panax quinquefolium, Toxicodendron radicans, and Hybanthus concolor.

References

External links
photo of herbarium specimen at Missouri Botanical Garden, collected in Oklahoma in 1984, isotype of Solidago ouachitensis

ouachitensis
Flora of Arkansas
Flora of Oklahoma
Plants described in 1986
Endemic flora of the United States